Keniera (also Kéniéran, Kéniéra, Kenieran) is a town in eastern Guinea.  It has a population of approximately 2,600.

In February 1882, the West African military leader Samori first engaged French forces at Keniera.  After waiting for the French to exhaust their ammunition, he overcame them in an attack with spears.

References 

"Les derniers jours de Keniera," L'Intrépide magazine, Oct. 10, 1910.

Populated places in the Kankan Region